Dillon Falls is an unincorporated community in Muskingum County, in the U.S. state of Ohio.

History
Dillon Falls was named for Moses Dillon, who settled here at the falls of the Licking River. A variant name was Dillon. A post office called Dillon was established in 1887, and remained in operation until 1908. Besides the post office, Dillon Falls had a station on the Baltimore and Ohio Railroad.

References

Unincorporated communities in Muskingum County, Ohio
1887 establishments in Ohio
Populated places established in 1887
Unincorporated communities in Ohio